Japreece Monet Dean (born June 4, 1996, in Austin, Texas) is an American professional basketball player.

Dean completed her college career with the UCLA Bruins of the University of California, Los Angeles in 2020. Before transferring to UCLA in 2017, she played two seasons for Texas Tech. In high school, Dean played for Vista Ridge High School in Cedar Park, Texas.

Family
Dean has two brothers. Her mother is a former college basketball player who played for Frank Phillips College in Borger, Texas. Her father is a former high school basketball scout.

References

External links
UCLA Bruins bio

1996 births
Living people
American women's basketball players
Basketball players from Austin, Texas
Chicago Sky draft picks
Point guards
UCLA Bruins women's basketball players
African-American basketball players
21st-century African-American sportspeople
21st-century African-American women